is a Japanese kickboxer, currently competing in the lightweight division of Shootboxing. He is a three-weight Shootboxing champion, having held titles at featherweight (-57.5 kg), super featherweight (-60 kg) and lightweight (-62.5 kg).

As of October 2022, Beyond Kick ranks him as the tenth best featherweight kickboxer in the world.

Kickboxing career

Featherweight
Kasahara made his professional debut against Genki Takeno at SHOOT BOXING2015～SB30th Anniversary～ act.3 on June 21, 2015. He won the fight by unanimous decision. Kasahara would amass a 9–0 record during the next year, before suffering a stoppage loss at the hands of Shogo Kuriaki at REBELS.46 on October 23, 2016.

Kasahara faced Kenichi TencloberGym at SHOOT BOXING 2017 act.1 on February 11, 2017. He won the fight by unanimous decision. He would add two more decision victories to his record that year, as he was able to beat Yuuichi at SHOOT BOXING 2017 act.2 on April 8, and Genki at SHOOT BOXING 2017 act.3 on June 16. Kasahara avenged his first professional loss to Shogo Kuriaki at SHOOT BOXING 2017 act.4 on September 16, 2017, as he was able to knock Kuriaki out with a left hook to the body at the 2:15 minute mark of the third round. His winning streak was snapped by Kazuki Fukada at SHOOT BOXING BATTLE SUMMIT-GROUND ZERO TOKYO 2017 on November 22, 2017, who beat him by split decision, after an extra fourth round was fought.

Kasahara faced Yuta Hamamoto at Shoot Boxing 2018 act.1 on February 10, 2018. He won the fight by unanimous decision. Kasahara next faced Naoya at Shoot Boxing 2018 act.3 on June 10, 2018. He knocked Naoya out with a head kick at the 2:26 minute mark of the opening frame.

His 15–2 record earned Kasahara the chance to challenge the reigning Shootboxing Japan featherweight (-57.5 kg) champion Genki at Shoot Boxing 2018 act.4 on September 15, 2018. He captured his first professional title by unanimous decision.

Kasahara faced Kohei "MOMOTARO" Kodera in a non-title bout at SHOOT BOXING S-Cup 65kg World Tournament 2018	on November 18, 2018. Kodera handed Kasahara his third professional loss, as he won the fight by unanimous decision. Kasahara faced Yukinori Ogasawara in another non-title bout at Shoot Boxing 2019 act.2 on April 27, 2019. He won the fight by unanimous decision.

Super featherweight
Following his rebounded victory over Ogasawara, Kasahara had his first fight at the super featherweight (-60 kg) limit, as he was booked to face the former SHOOT BOXING Japan Super bantamweight champion Taiki Naito at Shoot Boxing 2019 act.3 on June 23, 2019. He won the fight by majority decision, after two additional rounds were contested.

Kasahara challenged the reigning Shootboxing Japan super featherweight (-60 kg) champion Kazuki Fukada at Shoot Boxing 2019 act.4 on September 29, 2019. He won the fight by a second-round technical knockout, after he had knocked Fukuda down three times by the 1:24 minute mark of the round.

Kasahara's three-fight winning streak was stopped by Yota Shigemori, who beat him by a fourth-round technical knockout at Shoot Boxing: Ground Zero 2019 on December 3, 2019. Kasahara was able to rebounded from the fourth loss of his professional career with a third-round technical knockout of Taisuke Maeguchi at Shoot Boxing 2020 act.1 on February 15, 2020.

Lightweight
Following a nine-month break in competition, forced on him by the COVID-19 pandemic, Kasahara moved up to lightweight (-62.5 kg). He faced Hiroyuki Oshiro in his divisional debut at Shoot Boxing 2020 act.2 on November 28, 2020. He won the fight by a narrowly contested unanimous decision.

Kasahara faced the former REBELS lightweight and super lightweight champion Suarek Rukkukamui at Shoot Boxing 2021 act.1 on February 7, 2021. He won the fight by a second-round technical knockout, forcing Suarek's corner to throw in the towel at the 2:18 minute mark.

Kasahara faced Kyohei Furumura at Shoot Boxing 2021 act.3 on June 20, 2021. He won the fight by unanimous decision. Kasahara next faced Paranrak at Shoot Boxing 2021 act.4 on September 4, 2021. He stopped the Thai with a left hook to the body in the final minute of the opening round. Kasahara faced Yota Shigemori at Shoot Boxing 2021 Champion Carnival on December 26, 2021, in his fourth and final bout of the year. He won the fight by unanimous decision.

Kasahara challenged the Shootboxing Japan Lightweight (-62.5 kg) champion Renta Nishioka at Shoot Boxing 2022 act.2 on April 10, 2022. He won the fight by a second-round stoppage, flooring Nishioka with a right hook.

Kasahara faced the KNOCK OUT Black Lightweight champion Bazooka Koki at Shoot Boxing 2022 act.3 on June 26, 2022. He won the fight by a third-round technical knockout. The ringside physician stopped the fight 41 seconds into the round, due to a cut above Koki's left eye.

Kasahara made his Rizin FF debut against Yusaku Ishizuki at Rizin 37 - Saitama on July 31, 2021. He won the fight by unanimous decision.

Kasahara faced Lompetch Y'zdgym at Shoot Boxing 2022 act.4 on July 19, 2022. He won the fight by unanimous decision.

Kasahara faced the three-time WBC Muay Thai World title challenger Chadd Collins at RISE WORLD SERIES / SHOOTBOXING-KINGS on December 25, 2022. He lost the fight by unanimous decision, with scores of 30–29, 30–28 and 30–27.

Super lightweight
Kasahara was expected to face Anurak Tded99 in a super lightweight (-65 kg) bout at SHOOT BOXING 2023 act.1 on February 12, 2023. Anurak withdrew from the bout on February 3, after suffering a cut, and was replaced by the 2021 Sports Authority of Thailand Fighter of the Year Lamnamoonlek Tded99. Kasahara won the fight by unanimous decision, after three extension rounds were contested.

Championships and accomplishments

Professional
Shootboxing
2018 Shootboxing Japan Featherweight (-57.5 kg) Championship
2019 Shootboxing Japan Super Featherweight (-60 kg) Championship
2022 Shootboxing Japan Lightweight (-62.5 kg) Championship

Amateur
Shootboxing
2011 All Japan Shoot Boxing Kids Upper Grade Champion
2012 All Japan Shoot Boxing Kids Upper Grade Champion
2013 All Japan Shoot Boxing Junior -55kg Champion
2014 All Japan Shoot Boxing Junior -60kg Champion

Fight record
 
|-  style="background:#cfc;"
| 2023-02-12 || Win ||align=left| Lamnamoonlek Tded99 || SHOOT BOXING 2023 act.1|| Tokyo, Japan || 3rd Ext.R Decision (Unanimous) || 6 || 3:00 
|-  style="background:#fbb;"
| 2022-12-25|| Loss ||align=left| Chadd Collins || RISE WORLD SERIES / SHOOTBOXING-KINGS|| Tokyo, Japan || Decision (Unanimous) || 3 || 3:00
|-  style="background:#cfc;"
| 2022-09-17|| Win ||align=left| Lomphet Y'ZDGYM  || SHOOT BOXING 2022 act.4|| Tokyo, Japan || Decision (Unanimous) || 3 || 3:00 

|-  bgcolor="#cfc"
| 2022-07-31|| Win||align=left| Yusaku Ishizuki|| Rizin 37 - Saitama || Saitama, Japan || Decision (Unanimous) ||3  ||3:00 

|-  style="background:#cfc;"
| 2022-06-26|| Win ||align=left| Bazooka Koki ||SHOOT BOXING 2022 act.3|| Tokyo, Japan || TKO (Doctor stoppage)|| 3 || 0:41

|-  style="background:#cfc;"
| 2022-04-10|| Win||align=left| Renta Nishioka||SHOOT BOXING 2022 act.2|| Tokyo, Japan || KO (Left hook to the body)|| 2 ||1:24 
|-
! style=background:white colspan=9 |

|-  style="background:#cfc;"
| 2021-12-26|| Win ||align=left| Yota Shigemori || SHOOT BOXING 2021 Champion Carnival|| Tokyo, Japan || Decision (Unanimous) ||3 ||3:00

|-  style="text-align:center; background:#cfc;"
| 2021-09-04|| Win ||align=left| Paranglak FellowGym || SHOOT BOXING 2021 act.4 || Tokyo, Japan || KO (Left hook to the body)  || 1 ||2:18 

|-  style="text-align:center; background:#cfc;"
| 2021-06-20|| Win ||align=left| Kyohei Furumura|| SHOOT BOXING 2021 act.3 || Tokyo, Japan || Decision (Unanimous)  || 3 || 3:00

|- align="center"  bgcolor="#cfc"
| 2021-02-07|| Win ||align=left| Suarek Rukkukamui ||SHOOT BOXING 2021 act.2|| Tokyo, Japan || TKO (Corner stoppage) || 2 || 2:18 

|- align="center"  bgcolor="#cfc"
| 2020-12-28|| Win ||align=left| Hulk Oshiro ||SHOOT BOXING 2020 act.2|| Tokyo, Japan || Decision (Unanimous) || 3 || 3:00 

|- align="center"  bgcolor="#cfc"
| 2020-02-15|| Win ||align=left| Taison Maeguchi ||SHOOT BOXING 2020 act.1|| Tokyo, Japan || TKO (Doctor Stoppage) || 3 || 1:14 

|- align="center"  bgcolor="#FFBBBB"
| 2019-12-03|| Loss ||align=left| Yota Shigemori ||SHOOT BOXING GROUND ZERO TOKYO 2019|| Tokyo, Japan || TKO (Doctor Stoppage) || 4 || 2:34

|- style="text-align:center; background:#CCFFCC;"
| 2019-09-28|| Win || align="left" | Kazuki Fukada || SHOOT BOXING 2019 act.4 ||Tokyo, Japan|| TKO (3 Knockdowns) || 2 || 1:42
|-
! style=background:white colspan=9 |

|- style="text-align:center; background:#CCFFCC;"
| 2019-06-23|| Win || align="left" | Taiki Naito || SHOOT BOXING 2019 act.3 ||Tokyo, Japan|| 2nd Ext.R Decision (Majority) || 5 || 3:00

|-  style="text-align:center; background:#CCFFCC;"
| 2019-04-27 || Win ||align=left| Yukinori Ogasawara|| SHOOT BOXING 2019 act.2 || Tokyo, Japan || Decision (Unanimous)|| 3 || 3:00

|-  style="text-align:center; background:#FFBBBB;"
| 2018-11-18 || Loss ||align=left| MOMOTARO|| SHOOT BOXING S-cup 65kg World TOURNAMENT 2018 || Tokyo, Japan || Decision (Unanimous)|| 3 || 3:00

|-  style="text-align:center; background:#CCFFCC;"
| 2018-09-15 || Win ||align=left| Genki|| SHOOT BOXING2018 act.4 || Tokyo, Japan || Decision (Unanimous)|| 5 || 3:00
|-
! style=background:white colspan=9 |

|-  style="text-align:center; background:#CCFFCC;"
| 2018-06-10 || Win ||align=left| Naoya|| SHOOT BOXING 2018 act.3 || Tokyo, Japan || KO (High kick) || 1 || 2:26

|-  style="text-align:center; background:#CCFFCC;"
| 2018-02-10 || Win ||align=left| Yuudai Hamamoto|| SHOOT BOXING 2018 act.1 || Tokyo, Japan || Decision (Unanimous)|| 3 || 3:00

|-  style="text-align:center; background:#FFBBBB;"
| 2017-11-22 || Loss ||align=left| Kazuki Fukada|| SHOOT BOXING BATTLE SUMMIT-GROUND ZERO TOKYO 2017 || Tokyo, Japan || Ext.R Decision (Split)|| 4 || 3:00

|-  style="text-align:center; background:#CCFFCC;"
| 2017-09-16 || Win ||align=left| Shogo Kuriaki|| SHOOT BOXING 2017 act.4 || Tokyo, Japan || KO (Left hook to the body)|| 3 || 2:15

|-  style="text-align:center; background:#CCFFCC;"
| 2017-06-16 || Win ||align=left| Genki|| SHOOT BOXING 2017 act.3 || Tokyo, Japan || Decision (Unanimous)|| 3 || 3:00

|-  style="text-align:center; background:#CCFFCC;"
| 2017-04-08 || Win ||align=left| Yuuichi|| SHOOT BOXING 2017 act.2 || Tokyo, Japan || Decision (Unanimous)|| 3 || 3:00

|-  style="text-align:center; background:#CCFFCC;"
| 2017-02-11 || Win ||align=left| Kenichi TencloberGym|| SHOOT BOXING 2017 act.1 || Tokyo, Japan || Decision (Unanimous)|| 3 || 3:00

|-  style="text-align:center; background:#fbb;"
| 2016-10-23 || Loss ||align=left| Shogo Kuriaki || REBELS.46 || Tokyo, Japan ||TKO (Punches) || 2 || 1:31

|-  style="text-align:center; background:#CCFFCC;"
| 2016-09-19 || Win ||align=left| Yusuke Kitagawa || SHOOT BOXING 2016 act.4 || Tokyo, Japan || TKO (Cornern stoppage) || 3 || 1:58

|-  style="text-align:center; background:#CCFFCC;"
| 2016-08-21 || Win ||align=left| Yoshinobu Ozaki || SHOOTBOXING Young Cesar in Hanayashiki act.3 || Tokyo, Japan || Decision (Unanimous)|| 3 || 3:00

|-  style="text-align:center; background:#CCFFCC;"
| 2016-06-05 || Win ||align=left| Atsushi Sakamura || SHOOT BOXING 2016 act.3 || Tokyo, Japan || TKO|| 3 || 2:31

|-  style="text-align:center; background:#CCFFCC;"
| 2016-04-16 || Win ||align=left| Namiki Kawahara || SHOOT BOXING 2016 Young Cesar vol.1 || Tokyo, Japan || Decision (Unanimous)|| 3 || 3:00

|-  style="text-align:center; background:#CCFFCC;"
| 2016-02-13 || Win ||align=left| Ryota Naito || SHOOT BOXING 2016 act.1 || Tokyo, Japan || Decision (Unanimous)|| 3 || 3:00

|-  style="text-align:center; background:#CCFFCC;"
| 2015-12-01 || Win ||align=left| Yuai Kannaka || SHOOT BOXING 30th ANNIVERSARY GROUND ZERO TOKYO 2015 || Tokyo, Japan || TKO || 2 || 3:00

|-  style="text-align:center; background:#CCFFCC;"
| 2015-09-19 || Win ||align=left| Saiki Toboru || SHOOT BOXING2015～SB30th Anniversary～ act.4 || Tokyo, Japan|| Decision (Unanimous)|| 2 || 1:35

|-  style="text-align:center; background:#CCFFCC;"
| 2015-08-22 || Win ||align=left| Yugo || SHOOT BOXING 30th ANNIVERSARY CAESAR TIME! || Tokyo, Japan|| Decision (Unanimous)|| 3 || 3:00

|-  style="text-align:center; background:#CCFFCC;"
| 2015-06-21 || Win ||align=left| Genki Takeno || SHOOT BOXING2015～SB30th Anniversary～ act.3 || Tokyo, Japan|| Decision (Unanimous)|| 3 || 3:00

|-
| colspan=9 | Legend:    

|- align="center"  bgcolor="#CCFFCC"
| 2014-12-21|| Win ||align=left| Ryoga Imoto ||All Japan Amateur Shoot Boxing || Japan || TKO ||1 || 
|-
! style=background:white colspan=9 |

|-  style="text-align:center; background:#FFBBBB;"
| 2014-06-29 || Loss||align=left| Koudai Hirayama || SHOOT BOXING Amateur|| Osaka, Japan || Decision || 2 || 2:00

|- align="center"  bgcolor="#FFBBBB"
| 2014-04-20|| Loss ||align=left| Renta Nishioka ||Amateur SHOOT BOXING|| Tokyo, Japan || Decision (Unanimous) || 2 || 2:00

|- align="center"  bgcolor="#FFBBBB"
| 2014-02-09|| Loss ||align=left| Ryoichi Hashimoto ||SHOOT BOXING CENTRAL 9 ~Young Caesar Cup~|| Nagoya, Japan || Decision (Unanimous) || 2 || 2:00

|-  style="text-align:center; background:#CCFFCC;"
| 2013-11-16 || Win||align=left| Gaku Sakamoto || Shootboxing GROUND ZERO TOKYO 2013, All Japan Amateur Shootboxing Final|| Osaka, Japan || Decision (Unanimous)||  || 
|-
! style=background:white colspan=9 |

|-  style="text-align:center; background:#CCFFCC;"
| 2013-10-13 || Win||align=left| Masahiro Osawa || SHOOT BOXING Amateur || Tokyo, Japan || Decision ||  || 

|-  style="text-align:center; background:#CCFFCC;"
| 2013-02-10|| Win||align=left| Kenta Hattori || SHOOT BOXING Amateur || Tokyo, Japan || Decision (Unanimous)|| 2 || 1:00

|-  style="text-align:center; background:#fbb;"
| 2012-06-24|| Loss||align=left| Shohei Setoguchi || SHOOT BOXING Amateur || Tokyo, Japan || Ext.R Decision (Unanimous)|| 3 || 1:00

|-  style="text-align:center; background:#CCFFCC;"
| 2012-02-22 || Win||align=left| Gaku Sakamoto || SHOOT BOXING Amateur|| Osaka, Japan || Decision (Split)|| 2 || 2:00

|-  style="text-align:center; background:#CCFFCC;"
| 2011-11-27 || Win||align=left| Kaku Niimi || SHOOT BOXING Amateur|| Osaka, Japan || Decision (Majority)|| 2 || 2:00

|-  style="text-align:center; background:#fbb;"
| 2010-08-07 || Loss ||align=left| Shohei Setoguchi || Young Caesar Cup Tokyo 2010 || Tokyo, Japan || Decision (Unanimous)|| 1 || 2:00

|-
| colspan=9 | Legend:

See also
 List of male kickboxers

References

Living people
1999 births
Japanese male kickboxers
People from Taitō
Taito people
Sportspeople from Tokyo